Sate taichan is a variation of chicken satay grilled and served without peanut or ketjap seasoning unlike other satays.  It is served with sambal and squeezed key lime, while the chicken meat used with this satay generally plain white in colour and only seasoned with salt, key lime, and a little chili. Like other satays, sate taichan is sold at night.

See also

 Satay
 Sate padang

References 

Satay
Indonesian cuisine
Street food in Indonesia